The Royal Agricultural and Horticultural Society of South Australia was founded in November 1839 as the South Australian Agricultural Society with the aim of promoting primary industries in the Colony. The Society and its functions were patterned on similar organisations in England, and in its successive incarnations, the organisation has continued to pursue this aim (in the State) to the current day.

History

Foundation
The South Australian Agricultural Society was founded as the result of a public meeting held on 28 October 1839.

The original Constitution provided for a President, four Vice-Presidents, Hon. Secretary, Hon. Treasurer and a committee of 18 citizens selected by a formula intended to give representation to the range of members' interests and locations, one-third of whom were to retire annually by rotation. At some later stage, the committee increased to 40.

The initial appointees were

Governor Gawler accepted nomination as Patron.

On 23 November a group, discontented with the way membership of the Society had dropped away, resolved to re-inaugurate the Society as though it no longer existed. They advertised for a public meeting to be held on 6 December 1840 at Fordham's Hotel, conducted by a steering committee consisting of:

Agricultural and Horticultural Society
On 24 January 1842 a meeting was held at the Mayor (Thomas Wilson)'s chambers to form the South Australian Agricultural and Horticultural Society.
Office holders elected were

Turmoil
In February 1843 there was a popular feeling that the Society had been negligent in preparing for the Autumn Show. J. Bentham Neales offered the use of his auction yard as the venue, perhaps to stimulate some activity. (It was held, on 17 March, but only made possible by donations solicited by John Morphett from wealthy friends, as the Society had no funds.)

In August 1843 James Frew, president of the Ploughing Match Society met with others to change the name of his society to the  South Australian Agricultural Society (the original title of the Agricultural and Horticultural Society), and possibly to conduct shows of animals and produce. Under that name, the society conducted ploughing matches on 1 September 1843 The two organizations differed in their memberships: the S.A.A.& H.S. was largely composed of men of wealth and influence while the Ploughing Match Society/S.A.A.S. was more oriented to the practical farmer. Among their members were:

A meeting was called by officials of the S.A.A.& H.S. for Saturday 27 April 1844 to resolve the situation that, even if the two bodies could coexist, the similarity of their titles would be confusing to the public.

The Annual General Meeting of the Agricultural Society at Payne's Hotel on 7 May 1844 commenced with the chairman Mr Frew detailing activities of the previous year – (besides the ploughing match on 1 September, a Cattle Show on 20 October and exhibition of produce on 14 February) and looked forward to an Agricultural Show in September, in competition with that of the R.A.& H.S. Conceding that unification was necessary, he argued that the only way it could occur was by members of the other Society changing sides. The tone of the meeting changed however when Mr Lambert and Mr Harkness spoke in favour of union, with the proviso that Mr. Wotherspoon should by the Secretary of the unified Society.

Royal Patronage
In April 1868, following the highly successful Grand Exhibition, at which he was guest of honour, the Duke of Edinburgh accepted the role of Patron of the Society, which then became the Royal Agricultural and Horticultural Society of South Australia.

Office holders

Presidents

Chairmen and Presidents
The title "Chairman" changed to "President" with the 1859 election.

Secretaries
From 1955 the position was described as Director/Secretary

Directors

Activities
The Society's most visible activities were the Shows and Exhibitions, but also contributed in other ways:
During Show Week farmers descend on Adelaide from all over the state. Lectures and papers during show week inform of developments and educate in farm management.
coordinated farmers' experiences with problems such as Red rust in wheat
promulgated information on oil seeds, foot and mouth disease outbreak in UK 1881, phylloxera, codlin moth, rabbits
supported work of Professor Lowrie in the face of criticism from politicians in SA and elsewhere.
conducted tests of farm machinery and methods, often in the form of public contests.
Egg Laying Contests
Prizes and medals awarded to students at Roseworthy College

Ploughing matches
This event, as popularized in England, had teams of horses or bullocks competing and were judged on the straightness and uniformity of depth of the furrow and the way the earth was turned over, and of course the time for the team to complete its allocated area. Prizes were allocated according to divisions which reflected the class of ploughing team. Difficulties in organising such events included finding sufficient area of uniform consistency to give ensure fair competition and having had sufficient rain that the ground was not impossibly hard and yet not boggy. The first such organised in South Australia was by the South Australian Agricultural Society in September 1843 and attracted considerable public interest and was emulated by many of the regional agricultural societies.

Country societies
During the 19th and early 20th centuries many South Australian country centres formed societies with similar aims, following the British model. These included:
Auburn
Balaklava and Dalkey
Blyth and Kybunga
Booyoolie
Burra
Carrieton
Central Eyre Peninsula
Central Yorke Peninsula
Clare
Clarendon
Colton (15 km north of Elliston)
Cummins
Dry Creek
Eudunda
Gawler
Golden Grove
Great Flinders Agricultural and Horticultural Society first show 1903 at Lipson.
Gumeracha
Hindmarsh
Kalangadoo
Kapunda
Karoonda
Kingston (i.e. Kingston SE)
Lake Albert
Lipson
Longwood
Loxton
Lucindale
Lyndoch Valley
Maitland
Mallala and Dublin
Mannum
Millicent
Mintaro
Moonta
Mount Compass and Nangkita
Mount Gambier
Mount Lofty
Mount Pleasant
Mount Remarkable
Murray Bridge
Northern Areas Amalgamated Agricultural and Horticultural Societies Cradock in 1883, Wilson in 1884)
Onkaparinga
Orroroo
Penola
Penong and Western Districts
Petersburg
Pinnaroo
Port Elliot (Southern Agricultural and Horticultural Society)
Port Lincoln
Port Pirie
Port Wakefield
Quorn
Renmark
Robe
Saddleworth
Snowtown
Southern
Southern Yorke Peninsula 
Stanley
Stirling
Strathalbyn
Tantanoola
Tatiara
Torrens Valley
Two Wells/Two Wells Amalgamated
Uraidla and Summertown
Virginia and Port Gawler
Willowie
Willunga, Aldinga, McLaren Vale, Noarlunga
Wilmington (Beautiful Valley Agricultural and Horticultural Society in 1883)
Wooroora
Yankalilla
Yatina
Yorketown

See also
Royal Adelaide Show
Adelaide Showgrounds

References

Sources
Kerr, Colin and Margaret Royal Show Stock Journal Publishers, for Royal Agricultural and Horticultural Society 1983 

Horticultural organisations based in Australia
Agricultural organisations based in Australia
Organisations based in Australia with royal patronage
Agriculture in South Australia